Waikare River may refer to:

 Waikare River (Northland)
 Waikare River (Bay of Plenty)

See also
 Waikari River (disambiguation)